Rhodopis (real name possibly Doricha) or Rodopis was a celebrated 6th-century BCE Greek hetaera, of Thracian origin. She is one of only two hetaerae mentioned by name in Herodotus' discussion of the profession (the other is the somewhat later Archidike).

Slavery

According to Herodotus, she was a fellow-slave of the fable teller Aesop, with whom in one version of her story she had a secret love affair; both of them belonged to Iadmon of Samos. She afterwards became the property of Xanthes, another Samian, who took her to Naucratis in Egypt, during the reign of Amasis II, where she met Charaxus, brother of the poet Sappho, who had gone to Naucratis as a merchant. Charaxus fell in love with her, and ransomed her from slavery with a large sum of money, so that henceforth all the money she made from her profession would be her own. Sappho later wrote a poem accusing Rhodopis of robbing Charaxus of his property. She also ridiculed her brother in one of her poems for getting himself entangled with Rhodopis.

After liberation

Rhodopis continued to live at Naucratis after her liberation from slavery, and tithed a tenth part of her income to the temple at Delphi. She converted this tithe into large iron spits for cooking oxen, and sent these to Delphi: "these lie in a heap to this day, behind the altar set up by the Chians and in front of the shrine itself." where a large number of ten iron spits were dedicated in her name; these spits were seen by Herodotus.

Tales and legends

Some 400 years after Herodotus, Strabo stated that Sappho called Rhodopis "Doricha". And 200 years after Strabo, Athenaeus maintained that Herodotus had confused two separate women. As "rhodopis" means "rosy cheeks", it was probably a professional pseudonym, but it is unclear whether "Doricha" was her real name. It was the Hellenistic biographical tradition associated with Posidippus that followed the notion that Rodopis and Doricha were one individual.

There was a tale current in Greece that Rhodopis caused the construction of the third pyramid. Herodotus takes great pains to show the absurdity of the story, but it persisted and is related by Pliny the Elder as an unquestioned fact.  A variant of this story is told by both Diodorus Siculus and Strabo, in which the pyramid was built by lovers of Rhodopis to be her tomb. The origin of this tale, which is unquestionably false, has been explained with great probability by Georg Zoega and Christian Charles Josias Bunsen. In consequence of the name Rhodopis, she was confounded with Nitocris, the Egyptian queen, and the heroine of many an Egyptian legend, who was said by Julius Africanus and Eusebius to have built the third pyramid.

Another tale about Rhodopis related by Strabo and Aelian makes her a queen of Egypt, and thus renders the supposition of her being the same as Nitocris still more probable. It is said that as Rhodopis was one day bathing at Naucratis, an eagle took up one of her sandals, flew away with it, and dropped it in the lap of the Egyptian king, as he was administering justice at Memphis. Struck by the strange occurrence and the beauty of the sandal, he did not rest till he had found the fair owner of the beautiful sandal, and as soon as he had discovered her made her his queen. This is the Rhodopis story, famed for being the earliest Cinderella story.

Rhodopis was also linked to Helen of Troy not only because of thematic similarities of their stories but also due to the epithet that Herodotus used for her.

References

Hetairai
6th-century BC Greek people
6th-century BC Greek women
Thracian women
Ancient Thracian Greeks
Year of birth unknown
Ancient Greek slaves and freedmen
Naucratians

el:Ροδώπις
it:Rodopi (schiava)